Mundindi Didi Kilengo is the ambassador of the Democratic Republic of the Congo to Angola.

In 1997, militants of an unknown affiliation shot at the DRC's embassy in Angola. Kilengo remained unharmed.

References

Living people
Year of birth missing (living people)
Democratic Republic of the Congo diplomats
Ambassadors of the Democratic Republic of the Congo to Angola